Al-Judayyda is one of the districts  of Karak governorate, Jordan.

References 

 
Districts of Jordan